20va Sathabdam (subtitled with the translated title 20th Century) is a 1990 Telugu action crime thriller film directed by Kodi Ramakrishna. The film stars Suman, Devaraj and Lizy, with Suman Ranganathan in a cameo role. It is produced by R. V. Vijay Kumar under the Sri Sai Ram Creations banner. The music was composed by J. V. Raghavulu.

The movie shows how crime was in the 20th century. Chart-topping songs include "Ammani Minchi Daivamunnada" and "Naa Prema Nava Parijatam". The former is one of the best Telugu songs about the mother. The movie is a remake of the 1987 Malayalam movie Irupatham Noottandu starring Mohanlal, which was also remade in Kannada as Jackey (1989), starring Ambareesh. Devaraj reprised his role from the Kannada version. Suman later appeared in a villain role in Sagar Alias Jacky Reloaded, the sequel of the original Malayalam film.

Cast
Suman as Chandram / King
Devaraj as Suryam
Lizy as Rani
Suman Ranganathan
Gopi
Babu Mohan as Suryam's uncle
R. V. Vijay Kumar
Ashok Kumar
Dubbing Janaki as Chandram's mother
Telangana Shakuntala
Bhavani Prasad
Koka Raghava Rao

Soundtrack

 "Ammani Minchi Daivamunnada" -
"20va Sathabdam" -
"Ammani Minchi Daivamunnada" (Sad) -
"Kaalina Manasuto" -
"Naa Prema Nava Parijatam" -

References

External links

1990 films
1990s Telugu-language films
1990s crime action films
Indian crime action films
Indian crime thriller films
1990 crime thriller films
Indian political thriller films
Films about organised crime in India
Films about the illegal drug trade
Films directed by Kodi Ramakrishna
Films scored by J. V. Raghavulu
Telugu remakes of Malayalam films
1990s political thriller films
Films about the Narcotics Control Bureau